The War Remnants Museum is a war museum at 28 Vo Van Tan, in District 3, Ho Chi Minh City (Saigon), Vietnam. It contains exhibits relating to the First Indochina War and the Vietnam War.

History
Operated by the Ho Chi Minh City government, an earlier version of this museum opened on September 4, 1975, as the Exhibition House for US and Puppet Crimes. It was located in the former United States Information Agency building. The exhibition was not the first of its kind for the North Vietnamese side, but rather followed a tradition of such exhibitions exposing war crimes, first those of the French and then those of the Americans, who had operated in the country as early as 1954.

Formerly known as the "Museum of Chinese and American War Crimes", the name was changed in 1990 to Exhibition House for Crimes of War and Aggression (Nhà trưng bày tội ác chiến tranh xâm lược), dropping both "U.S." and "Puppet." In 1995, following the normalization of diplomatic relations with the United States and end of the US embargo a year before, the references to "war crimes" and "aggression" were dropped from the museum's title as well; it became the War Remnants Museum.

Exhibits
The museum comprises a series of themed rooms in several buildings, with period military equipment placed within a walled yard. The military equipment includes a UH-1 "Huey" helicopter, an F-5A fighter, a BLU-82 "Daisy Cutter" bomb, M48 Patton tank, an A-1 Skyraider attack bomber, and an A-37 Dragonfly attack bomber. There are a number of pieces of unexploded ordnance stored in the corner of the yard, with their charges and/or fuses removed.

One building reproduces the "tiger cages" in which the South Vietnamese government kept political prisoners. Other exhibits include graphic photography, accompanied by a short text in English, Vietnamese and Japanese, covering the effects of Agent Orange and other chemical defoliant sprays, the use of napalm and phosphorus bombs, and war atrocities such as the My Lai massacre. The photographic display includes work by Vietnam War photojournalist Bunyo Ishikawa that he donated to the museum in 1998. Curiosities include a guillotine used by the French and South Vietnamese to execute prisoners, the last time being in 1960, and three jars of preserved human fetuses deformed by exposure to dioxins and dioxin-like compounds, contained in the defoliant Agent Orange.

Within the museum, visitors can find permanent and temporary exhibitions focusing on events dating from when the First Indochina War began in 1946, up until the end of the Vietnam War in 1975.

Past short-term exhibitions include Agent Orange in Vietnam and Vietnam Rose After the War, in a first-floor side room that often features rotating photographic displays. From fall 2014 to spring 2015 Agent Orange: Messages from the Heart, a collection of photos featuring thriving survivors of war, signaled a departure from the museum's abrasive tone towards a more reconciliatory one, in line with its trajectory since the mid 1990s.

Reception 
The War Remnants Museum is currently one of the most popular museums in Vietnam, attracting approximately half a million visitors every year. According to the museum's own estimates, about two-thirds of these are foreigners.

US anthropologist Christina Schwenkel wrote the museum attempts to convey historical truths with 'self-representation', presenting images and other features without contextualising them as other museums do. Museum curators are described as being privy to the fact that knowledge about the Vietnam War and the interests of the Vietnamese is not typically known in other nations.

An analysis of the impression books (which the tourists may use to leave their comments in at the exit) revealed that the museum's visitors used to be mostly Europeans and North Americans before 2005, but that its audience became much more varied after Vietnam dropped their visa requirement for ASEAN countries that year. The impression books also record mixed responses to the museum. Others simply praised Vietnam, while some Americans harshly criticized the museum for its "propaganda" and "glorification of [their] victory". Broadening interests have expanded from other countries as well, including visits from tourists from Brazil, Turkey, South Africa and others expanding to see the museum.

Gallery

See also

Southeastern Armed Forces Museum Military Zone 7
Vietnam People's Air Force Museum, Ho Chi Minh City

References

External links

Pictures of the Vietnam War Remnants Museum
War Remnants Museum website

Vietnam War museums
Military and war museums in Vietnam
Museums in Ho Chi Minh City
Communist propaganda